Scythe is a 2016 young-adult novel by Neal Shusterman and is the first in the Arc of a Scythe series. It is set in the far future, where death, disease, and unhappiness have been virtually eliminated thanks to advances in technology, and a benevolent artificial intelligence known as the Thunderhead peacefully governs a united Earth. The notable exception to the Thunderhead's rule is the Scythedom, a group of humans whose sole purpose is to replicate mortal death in order to keep the population growth in check.

A feature-film adaptation is in the works. Sera Gamble was writing the script. However, the new draft is being written by Gary Dauberman.

The book was an Honor Book for the Michael L. Printz Award in 2017 for teenage novels.

Plot 

In the year 2042, effective immortality is discovered, allowing humans to reset their physical age while retaining their memory. In addition, advanced medical technology allows any injury, even fatal, to be repaired in a matter of days through nanites (or for more serious injuries, a hospital procedure known as revival). These revolutionary technologies allowed humanity to triumph over death and ended what is posthumously referred to as the Mortal Age.

In addition, a nigh-omnipotent artificial intelligence called the Thunderhead was also created around this time, described as the 'evolution of the cloud.' The Thunderhead was carefully designed with perfect and caring motives, wanting only to be a loving guardian of humanity. Although everyone was at first skeptical, every government eventually subsided to the Thunderhead, and all of Earth became united peacefully. Utilising all of humanity's knowledge and power, the Thunderhead solves climate change, mental illness, and discrimination. It also decides that death is still required in order to give life meaning, but is unwilling to be the means of death, as it is unable and does not want to be viewed as a killer.

Instead, a group of humans creates the Scythedom, an order of individuals who are responsible for killing ("gleaning") others permanently, unable to be revived by law. The Thunderhead finds this to be the best approach. Scythes wear rings that grant immunity by transferring one's DNA to a databank. Once becoming Scythes, they must take the name of a historic figure (such as Scythe Faraday or Scythe Volta). Scythes are entirely separate from the Thunderhead's rule, not having to abide by any law beyond the Scythedom's.

250 years after the Mortal Age, a Scythe named after Michael Faraday visits a house in MidMerica. There, he interrupts a family's dinner and joins them, seemingly unaware of their fears that he has arrived to glean them. The teen daughter, Citra Terranova, stands up to him, which he finds amusing. He then reveals that he has not come to glean them, but instead their neighbor, citing statistics from the Mortal Age that support his choice of gleaning.

Some weeks later, a teenager named Rowan Damisch is attending high school when he encounters Scythe Faraday as well. Faraday requests help locating the front desk, and Rowan nervously agrees. Once at the front desk, Faraday reveals that he is here to glean the school's top quarterback, as underage people driving while being intoxicated caused many deaths. He requests that Rowan guide him to the office so that the staff can locate the quarterback and retrieve him. Rowan does so, but refuses to leave as Faraday gleans the boy with an electric shock, even as everyone else flees.

In the following weeks, Rowan is shunned at school, as rumors spread that Faraday was his uncle and that Rowan requested the gleaning out of jealousy. Rowan initially tries to deny it, but then decides to lean into it, stating that Faraday will glean anyone he wants. This causes everyone to fear him, and he is no longer bullied.

Citra and Rowan both receive tickets to a theater performance, and they both decide to attend out of curiosity. They meet each other and Scythe Faraday, who arranged it all. He informs them that they have both been chosen to become his apprentices, admiring Citra's integrity and Rowan's compassion. They both accept the knowledge that only one of them can be ordained as a scythe at the end of their training.

They both live with Scythe Faraday while apprenticing, as he trains them in various ways of killing. He also takes them on his gleanings, so they become accustomed to killing. When they are racked with guilt merely for being present, Faraday is pleased that they do not enjoy the act of taking life.

A few months later, Faraday takes his apprentices to the tri-annual regional conclave of Scythes, where various laws and traditional acts are performed for half of a day. It becomes apparent that the regional Scythedom is split between the Old Guard, who believe that gleaning is a sacred act that requires compassion and a respect for death, and the New Order, who believes that Scythes should take pleasure in gleaning. Spearheading the New Order movement is Scythe Goddard, a charismatic man infamous for his cruel mass gleanings. On the opposition is Scythe Curie, who is well known for hunting down all members of government in the early days of immortality so that they would not be able to try and regain power.

At the conclave, Citra and Rowan are subjected to one of three tests along with other apprentices - the first being knowledge. Citra is asked by Scythe Curie what her greatest wrongdoing was. Citra says that she tripped a schoolmate down a flight of stairs, which resulted in breaking her neck, and spending three days being revived. Curie deems her to be lying. Rowan intentionally fails his question so that he remains with Citra.

During the meetings, one of Goddard's junior scythes objects to Faraday having two apprentices, and it is suggested that the succeeding apprentice must glean the rejected one. Faraday heavily objects but is overruled by High Blade Xenocrates, leader of the MidMerican Scythedom.

Soon after the conclave, Faraday disappears. Citra and Rowan are contacted by Xenocrates, who informs them that Faraday committed suicide in order to free them of their apprenticeship. However, this fails as Citra and Rowan are separated and taken on as other Scythe's apprentices - Curie and Goddard, respectively.

Citra is trained by Curie, who lives at Falling Water. However, Citra is suspicious of the circumstances of Faraday's gleaning, believing that he would not kill himself. She eventually finds that he died by throwing himself under a train, but discovers that all witnesses were given immunity by a Scythe afterwards. She suspects Goddard but can't find any concrete evidence, and begins using camera footage of the time and location to find out what happened.

Meanwhile, Rowan's morals are put to the test as he experiences Goddard's lifestyle, who lives in a mansion he took and has extravagant parties with a posse of new order Scythes. Rowan initially hates him, but slowly falls under Goddard's charismatic spell and brutal training methods, becoming conflicted over his identity and recognizing the monstrous side he is trying to keep down. Goddard brings him on several mass gleanings, during which Rowan secretly helps people to escape. In one before he had been apprenticed, Goddard saved a particular child, confusing Rowan. Rowan develops a friendship with Scythe Volta, a scythe with old-guard morals who believes that Goddard is the future. 

During one such party, High Blade Xenocrates is present. Goddard seems to have influence over him, especially when revealing the child. Rowan realizes that the child is Xenocrates', which goes against the law that Scythes are forbidden to have children. Goddard toys with Xenocrates, making him do ridiculous acts with the threat of killing his daughter. Rowan saves Xenocrates from drowning during one particular stunt. Goddard asks Xenocrates cryptically if fortune is smiling on Rowan as it has on Goddard, to which Xenocrates states that Citra will be rendered not an issue within the week.

At the next conclave, the test requires that each apprentice fight another. Citra and Rowan are paired for the spectacle, and Rowan tries to let Citra win. However, Citra refuses, and the two of them fight with the intention of losing. Eventually, Rowan decides that he needs to make Citra hate him, and so wins quickly by breaking Citra's neck violently. She is rushed out for revival and Rowan is disqualified. Once again they are tied for last.

Later, Citra is accused of murdering Faraday and she is hunted down. Curie brings her out of MidMerica to Amazonia (formerly the top of South America) as a refugee. Citra decides to follow a lead she had on Faraday's death and discovers that he is still alive and in hiding. He has not realized that they are still apprenticed but refuses to rejoin the Scythedom. Goddard, meanwhile, holds an impromtu party to celebrate Rowan's actions. 

Meanwhile, Goddard takes Rowan and his posse to a cloister of a religious group of anti-Scythe cultists known as Tonists. He promises Rowan will glean someone, despite that breaking the law that apprentices cannot glean. Goddard dismisses the thought and saves a Tonist for Rowan to glean. Instead, Rowan beheads Goddard with his own sword, kills the other Scythes, and burns their bodies, which prevents revival.  Rowan is suspected of these killings but there is not enough evidence to charge him.

At the next conclave, the apprentices are given a final test. They must kill a family member. Citra, who has been cleared of suspicion of murdering Faraday, struggles but succeeds in killing her younger brother Ben. She hears that Rowan shot his mother without any hesitation, meaning they both succeeded. Their victims are then revived. Both come before the conclave, where it is announced that Citra will become the newest Scythe.  After choosing the name Anastasia, her first assignment is to glean Rowan.

However, after she is given her Scythe's ring she punches Rowan.  This transfers his blood to her Scythe's ring, granting him immunity for a year. He escapes the conclave and finds Faraday, whom Citra has waiting for him with an untraceable car.  They quickly drive away.

In the epilogue Scythe Anastasia remarks on the recent stories of Scythe Lucifer, a rogue Scythe who hunts down corrupt and unworthy Scythes and permanently ends them. It appears that Rowan has become Scythe Lucifer. She states that she hopes when they meet again, he will remember her as one of the good ones.

Characters

Main characters 

 Scythe Michael Faraday - Honorable Scythe Faraday trains two apprentices, Citra and Rowan. He is well respected by the Old Guard and is the former lover of Scythe Curie.
 Rowan Damisch - Protagonist; trained by Scythe Faraday and later by Scythe Goddard as an apprentice. He becomes Scythe Lucifer, a vigilante gleaner of corrupt and 'unworthy' Scythes.
 Citra Terranova -  Protagonist; trained by Scythe Faraday and later Scythe Curie as an apprentice. She becomes Scythe Anastasia, named after the Russian princess Anastasia Romanov.
 Scythe Marie Curie - aka The Grande Dame of Death, who tests the Apprentices at their first Conclave and later becomes Citra's mentor. The former lover of Scythe Faraday.
 Scythe Robert Goddard -  A Scythe  known for mass gleanings and an opulent lifestyle. He is charismatic but narcissistic, and the New Order's effective leader.

Secondary characters 

 Scythe Volta - A Junior Scythe to Scythe Goddard. Secretly disgusted by the mass slaughters and his peers' behaviors, he self-gleans after guilt from genocidally killing Tonists and children.
 Scythe Chomsky - A Junior Scythe who works with Scythe Goddard who specializes in flamethrowers. Brainless and a fan of mass gleanings.
 Scythe Rand - Scythe who works with Scythe Goddard. Described as having pan-Asian features and a green robe. Extremely loyal to Goddard, she revels in death just as much as her mentor does.
 Esme - The secret daughter of High Blade Xenocrates, whom Goddard uses to control Xenocrates.
 High Blade Xenocrates - Holds the position of 'High Blade' of MidMerica. The father of Esme, which is used against him, because Scythes by law are forbidden to conceive and have children.
Tonists - Followers of a religious cult, they dislike Scythes and welcome the idea of 'natural death'. Sound is sacred to them. Often targets of Scythe attacks and mockery. They are said to believe in a thing called the Tone and an event known as the Great Resonance. Curie despises them, and Goddard makes a point to commit genocide against them.

Reception

Scythe has received the following accolades:

 2019: Barnes & Noble Young Adult Book Club Pick 
 2018: American Library Association (ALA) Top Ten Amazing Audiobooks for Young Adults
 2018: ALA Teen's Top Ten 
 2018: DUBLIN Literary Award Long List 
 2017: ALA Michael L. Printz Award
 2016: Booklist Starred Review
 2016: School Library Journal Starred Review 
 2016: Publishers Weekly Starred Review 
 2016: Kirkus Reviews' Best Books Of 2016

References

2016 American novels
2016 fantasy novels
2016 science fiction novels
2016 children's books
American young adult novels
American science fiction novels
American fantasy novels
Young adult fantasy novels
Children's science fiction novels
Dystopian novels
Novels set in the future
Simon & Schuster books